KDNZ (97.3 FM) is a radio station licensed to serve the community of Pecos, Texas. The station is owned by. It airs a classic country format.

The station was assigned the call sign KKLY by the Federal Communications Commission on October 25, 1996. The station changed its call sign to KIOL on December 7, 2004, back to KKLY on January 26, 2005, to KGEE on September 21, 2005, and to KDNZ on February 19, 2018. As of December 31, 2019 KDNZ is an affiliate of the American Cowboy Radio Network and airs Texas Tech Red Raiders football and men's basketball games.

References

External links
 Official Website
 

DNZ (FM)
Radio stations established in 2000
2000 establishments in Texas
Classic country radio stations in the United States
Reeves County, Texas